Rafael Petardi is a Canadian-American film and television actor.

Career 

Petardi's first major role was in a mini series alongside Québécois stars Remy Girard, Gildor Roy, Michel Barette, Patrick Labbe and Chantal Fontaine. He has also starred in many television shows such as La Vie and Rent-a-Goalie,  the latter garnering him 3 Gemini Award Nominations. He performed in films such as Rub & Tug, which was presented at the Toronto International Film Festival.

He has appeared in film and television roles such as ABC’s Flash Forward, CBS’ The Unit, supporting roles in films such as Beverly Hills Chihuahua, and Angels & Demons. Most recently Petardi guest starred on NCIS: Los Angeles. He now voices Chase Devineaux in Carmen Sandiego.

Filmography

Television

Video Games

References

External links
 

Year of birth missing (living people)
Living people
Canadian male television actors
Canadian male film actors
Canadian male voice actors